Geisonocerina is an extinct genus from the carnivorous nautiloid cephalopod order Orthocerida that lived in what would be North America, Europe, and Asia during the Ordovician through Permian from 449—290 mya, existing for approximately .

Taxonomy
Geisonocerina was named by Foeste (1935) and included in the Geisonoceratidae as part of the Orthocerida  where it is listed in Sepkoski (2002).

Morphology
Geisonocerina has an orthoconic shell with transverse lirae and striae that are periodically thickened. Internal features are similar to Geisonoceras wherein the siphuncle is subcentral with short straight necks and connecting rings that expand slightly into the camerae and in which there are annulosiphonate deposits in the more adapical (juvenile)portion of the siphuncle and cameral deposits in the adapical (early) chambers.

Fossil distribution

Geisonoceras has a widespread distribution covering North America, Europe and Asia. A. K. Miller and W.M Furnish  described Geisonocerina among a suite of 12 nautiloid genera from the Ordovician of the Black Hills, South Dakota.  In Europe, Geisonocerina elongatocintum was identified from a 1973 borehole drilled in the Wenlock area of the Welsh borderland to provide a continuous core from the Llanocery-Wenclock boundary.

References

 PaleoBiology Database: Geisonocerina, basic info

Cephalopod genera
Ordovician cephalopods
Silurian cephalopods
Devonian cephalopods
Carboniferous cephalopods
Permian cephalopods
Permian genus extinctions
Paleozoic cephalopods of Europe
Paleozoic cephalopods of Asia
Paleozoic cephalopods of North America
Ordovician first appearances